I Want Someone to Eat Cheese With is a 2006 American independent romantic comedy film written, produced, directed by, and starring Jeff Garlin, also featuring Sarah Silverman and Bonnie Hunt. Many improv veterans of Chicago's Second City and even its 1950s predecessor Compass Players appear, as well as Chicago radio personality Steve Dahl in a cameo.

Plot
Overweight, depressed improv actor James (Jeff Garlin) is a Second City cast member in Chicago. He lives with his mother and cheats on his diet. He quits his acting job on a sleazy television prank show, his girlfriend, Andrea (Rebecca Sage Allen), breaks up with him, and his agent, Herb (Richard Kind), dumps him. When he visits his friend's daughter's elementary school for Career Day, he rambles about his problems, boring the kids, and embarrassing himself in front of the teacher, Stella (Bonnie Hunt).

James relaxes in the evenings by lying on the hood of his car parked "in a great spot" beside Wrigley Field, and during the days by walking around the North Side of Chicago with his friend Luca (David Pasquesi), appreciating the buildings.

While wearing a pirate costume for a hot dog stand, James hears about a Chicago-based remake of Paddy Chayefsky's 1955 Marty, his favorite film, and one that mirrors his adult life.  He knows the director but cannot get an audition. After walking out on his Compulsive Eaters Anonymous meeting, James goes to an ice cream parlor, where he meets "big-time hottie" Beth (Sarah Silverman), who recognizes him from Second City and offers him free ice cream. She asks him an obscurely lewd question, which she then cheerfully explains.

James, smitten, returns to the shop, where Beth takes him on adventures, including a shopping trip for her to try on underwear. They meet later after one of his comedy performances.  One thing leads to another, and Beth volunteers to return to James's (and his mother's) apartment, where they have sex.

A day later, Beth succinctly dispatches James when he shows up at her apartment.  Beth explains that she had just never been with a fat guy. Meanwhile, his role in Marty is given to a clueless young actor, real-life teen idol Aaron Carter.

As the story ends, James moves to his own apartment. He reconnects with Stella, the elementary school teacher, and continues acting.

Cast

Production and distribution
"Garlin struggled to find financing, which twice fell through. He shot it in 18 days, but those days were spread out over two years," reported the Associated Press. IFC Films released the film on a non-traditional schedule, called "IFC First Take", part of  IFC in Theaters. It appeared on pay-per-view cable television simultaneously with a limited theatrical release, in September 2007. The DVD followed about seven months later, April 15, 2008. In the meantime, IFC made a deal with Blockbuster, giving the video chain 60 days of exclusive rental and video on demand rights on each film. During interviews on Late Night with Conan O'Brien and Wait Wait… Don't Tell Me!, Garlin said that the title bothers Larry David because it ends in a preposition.

Critical reception

The New York Times called the "rambling" film "laid back and affectionate". In an appreciative review, Chicago-based Roger Ebert called it "a minor movie, but a big-time minor movie... If there is such a thing as a must-see three-star movie, here it is." However, John Maynard in The Washington Post scorned the movie, writing, "A better awkward title would be 'Random Events of a Failed Actor Plodding the Streets of Chicago.'"

References

External links
 
 
 
 
 

2006 films
2006 independent films
2006 romantic comedy films
American independent films
American romantic comedy films
Films about actors
Films directed by Jeff Garlin
Films set in Chicago
Films shot in Chicago
Films shot in Los Angeles
The Weinstein Company films
2006 directorial debut films
2000s English-language films
2000s American films